The Politics of Fujian Province in the People's Republic of China is structured in a dual party-government system like all other governing institutions in mainland China.

The Governor of Fujian is the highest-ranking official in the People's Government of Fujian. However, in the province's dual party-government governing system, the Governor has less power than the Fujian Chinese Communist Party (CCP) Provincial Committee Secretary, colloquially termed the "Fujian Party Secretary".

List of provincial-level leaders

CCP Party Secretaries
Zhang Dingcheng: 1949-1954
Ye Fei: 1954-1958
Jiang Yizhen: 1958-1970
Han Xianchu: 1971-1973　
Liao Zhigao: 1974-1982
Xiang Nan: 1982-1986　
Chen Guangyi: 1986-1993　
Jia Qinglin: 1993-1996　
Chen Mingyi: 1996-2000　
Song Defu: 2000-2004
Lu Zhangong: 2004-2009　
Sun Chunlan: 2009-2012
You Quan: 2012-2017
Yu Weiguo: 2017-2020
Yin Li: 2020-2022
Zhou Zuyi: 2022-present

Chairpersons of Fujian People's Congress
Liao Zhigao: 1979-1982
Hu Hong: 1982-1985
Cheng Xu: 1985-1993
Chen Guangyi: 1993-1994
Jia Qinglin: 1994-1998
 Yuan Qitong: 1998-2002
Song Defu: 2002-2005
Lu Zhangong: 2005-2010
Sun Chunlan: 2010-2013
You Quan: 2013-2018
Yu Weiguo: 2018-2021
Yin Li: 2021-present

Governors
Zhang Dingcheng: 1949-1954
Ye Fei: 1954-1959
Jiang Yizhen: 1959
Wu Hongxiang: acting: 1960-1962
Jiang Yizhen: 1962
Wei Jinshui: 1962-1967
Han Xianchu: 1967-1973
Liao Zhigao: 1974-1979
Ma Xingyuan: 1979-1983
Hu Ping: 1983-1987
Wang Zhaoguo: 1987–1990　
Jia Qinglin: 1990–1994　
Chen Mingyi: 1994–1996　
He Guoqiang: 1996–1999　
Xi Jinping: 1999–2002　
Lu Zhangong: 2002–2004
Huang Xiaojing: 2004–2011
Su Shulin: 2011–2015
Yu Weiguo: 2015–2018
Tang Dengjie: 2018–2020
Wang Ning: 2020–2021
Zhao Long: 2021–present

Chairmen of Fujian CPPCC
Zeng Jingbing: 1955-1956
Jiang Yizhen: 1956-1959
Ye Fei: 1959-1964
Fan Shiren: 1964-1977
Liao Zhigao: 1977-1979
Wu Hongxiang: 1979-1985
Yuan Gai: 1985-1988
Chen Guangyi: 1988-1993
You Dexin: 1993-2003
Chen Mingyi: 2003-2008
Liang Qiping: 2008-2013
Zhang Changping: 2013-2018
Cui Yuying: 2018-present

See also
Fujian Provincial Government, the Republic of China's former parallel administration for its Fujian Province

Fujian

Fujian
Fujian